Pierre Hardy may refer to:
 Pierre Hardy (athlete) (1907–2000), French Olympic athlete
 Pierre Hardy (fashion designer) (born 1956), French footwear designer